Arnljótur Davíðsson (born 3 September 1968) is an Icelandic former footballer who played as a forward. He won three caps for the Iceland national football team in 1988.

References

External links

1968 births
Living people
Arnljotur Davidsson
Association football forwards
Arnljotur Davidsson
Arnljotur Davidsson
Arnljotur Davidsson
Arnljotur Davidsson
ÍR men's football players